Minuscule 1143 (in the Gregory-Aland numbering), ε 1035 (von Soden), also known as the Beratinus 2 (Albanian: Kodiku i Beratit nr. 2), or Codex Aureus Anthimi (The Golden Book of Anthimos). It is a Greek minuscule manuscript of the New Testament on purple parchment, dated paleographically to the 9th century. This is one of the seven “purple codices” in the world to have survived to the present day, and one of the two known purple minuscules (Minuscule 565 is the other) written with a gold ink.

Description 

The codex contains the complete text of the four Gospels, on 420 purple parchment leaves (24 by 19 cm). The text is written in one column per page, 17 lines per page, in gold. It is written in early minuscule, but some parts of the codex in semi-uncial, and titles in uncial letters. The codex contains simple miniatures, mainly geometrical figures, without any direct Christian symbols. There are also ornaments on the metal cover.

In terms of style and age, it is comparable to the Empress Theodora's Codex.

There is also a division according to the smaller Ammonian Sections, with references to the Eusebian Canons.
 

Text 

The Greek text of the codex is a representative of the Byzantine text-type. Kurt Aland did not place it in any Category. It was not examined by the Claremont Profile Method.

History 

The origin of this manuscript has been and remains the subject of debate. It was found in a church of Berat, and became known after publication written by bishop of Berat “Description abrégée et historique de la sainte métropole de Belgrade, aujourd’hui Berat” (Corfu, 1868). It was examined by Pierre Batiffol.

Formerly the codex was located in a church in Berat. Since 1971, it has been housed in the National Archives of Albania (No. 2) at Tirana. Codex Beratinus 2 now is registered with the UNESCO as a world treasure.

See also 

 List of New Testament minuscules (1001–2000)
 Purple parchment
 Textual criticism

References

Further reading 

 Pierre Batiffol, Les manuscrits grecs de Berat d'Albanie et le Codex Purpureus, Paris 1886. 
 Les Codex – Trésors de la Culture Albanaise, edit. Direction Général des Archives, 1999. 
 Sinani, Shaban: The codices of Albania (ed.), Albanian National Archives, Tirana 2003.

External links 

 
 Kodikët e Shqipërisë, Tiranë, 2003. 
 Images from Minuscule 1143 (a portion of the manuscript) at the CSNTM

Purple parchment
Greek New Testament minuscules
Medieval documents of Albania
9th-century biblical manuscripts
Memory of the World Register
9th-century illuminated manuscripts
Byzantine illuminated manuscripts